Dominique Marie-Joseph Merlet (born 18 February 1938) is a French contemporary pianist, organist and music educator.

Biography 
Born in Bordeaux, Dominique Merlet was a student of Roger-Ducasse, Louis Hiltbrand, and Nadia Boulanger. He won three first prizes at the Conservatoire de Paris before winning the premier prix, together with Martha Argerich, at the Geneva International Music Competition in 1957.

He went on to pursue a career as an international concert performer and made numerous recordings. The quality of his discography has been acclaimed several times: Prix Charles Cros, Diapason d'or, Grand Prix du disque...

Until 2004, he also worked as a pedagogue and adviser in Paris and Geneva for many young artists who are now pursuing an international career, including Dana Ciocarlie, Jean-Marc Luisada, Philippe Cassard, Frédéric Aguessy, Xu Zhong, François-Frédéric Guy, Kotaro Fukuma, Ha-Young Sul. Between 1956 and 1990, he was titular organist at Notre-Dame-des-Blancs-Manteaux in Paris.

Former president of EPTA, the European Association of Piano Teachers, Dominique Merlet is a regular member of the juries of the most prestigious international piano competitions. (see below)

Discography 
 Soloist
 Bartók, Danses roumaines, Élégie, Burlesque, Suite Op. 14, Sonata for piano (6-9 August 1979, FY/Disques du Solstice) 
 Brahms, Ballades Op. 10 ; Klavierstücke Op. 76 ; Fantaisies Op. 116 (2005, Mandala) 
 Chopin, works for piano (2010, Bayard Musique)
 Debussy, Pour le piano, Masques, Images (January 1993, Mandala MAN 4826) 
 Fauré Pieces for piano (July 1998, Mandala MAN 4933) 
 Fauré and Roger-Ducasse, works for piano (2010, Bayard Musique)
 Kirchner, works for piano: Präludien, Op. 9 ; Skizzen, Op. 11 ; Aquarellen, Op. 21 ; Confidences, Op. 96 ; Nachtbilder, Op. 25 (2002, Mandala) 
 Leguay, Azur, for piano (7-8 June 2012, Neos) 
 Liszt, Bénédiction de Dieu dans la solitude ; Sonnet de Pétrarque n°104 (April 1986, Quantum QM6891 / Bayard Musique) 
 Liszt, works for piano (2010, Bayard Musique)
 Ravel, integral piano works (1990/1991, 2CD Mandala MAN 4807/08 / Bayard Musique) 
 Roger-Ducasse, works for piano (2001, Mandala MAN 5011) 
 Satie, The Piano Work for Four Hands - with Jean-Pierre Armengaud (1993, Mandala / Bayard Musique S408805) 
 Schumann, Études symphoniques Op. 13 ; Arabesque Op. 18; Davidsbündlertänze Op. 6° (1966°/1968, Accord 202612) 
 Schumann, Allegro in b minor Op. 8 ; Sonata Op. 22 ; Trois romances Op. 28; Albumblätter Op. 124 (1966/1968, Accord) 
 L'Âge d'or du piano: Mozart (Fantasy KV. 397), Beethoven (Piano Sonata No. 31 Op. 110), Liszt (Sonnet de Pétrarque n° 123), Schumann (L'oiseau-prophète) (7-8 April 2009, Bayard Musique S 424586) 

 Chambrist
 Beethoven, Sonatas for piano and violin - Gérard Poulet, violin (1999/2000, 4CD Mandala MAN 4954/57) 
 Weber, Grand duo concertant, Op. 48; Trio for flute, cello and piano, Op. 63; Sonata for piano n°2, Op. 39 - Guy Deplus (clarinet), Martine Joste, Maxence Larrieu (flute), Michel Renard (cello) (1967–69, Accord Musidisc)

See also 
 III Sendai International Music Competition
 XIII International Chopin Piano Competition
 List of jurors of the International Chopin Piano Competition

References

External links 
 Entretien avec Dominique Merlet
 Dominique Merlet on Universalis
 Dominique Merlet pianiste on France Musique
 Dominique Merlet on musicme.com
 Dominique Merlet - Chopin / Fantaisie-impromptu on YouTube

20th-century French male classical pianists
1938 births
Musicians from Bordeaux
Living people
French music educators
Conservatoire de Paris alumni
Academic staff of the Conservatoire de Paris
21st-century French male classical pianists